Delacon Biotechnik Ges.m.b.H. is a multinational feed additive company headquartered in Engerwitzdorf, near Linz, Austria. The company develops and manufactures phytogenic feed additives for poultry, swine, ruminants and aqua since the 1980s. Delacon conducts in-house research and collaborates with independent institutes and universities.

From their production facility in Engerwitzdorf, Austria, Delacon distributes its products to about 80 countries worldwide; its main markets are Europe and Middle East, North America, Asia-Pacific and Latin America.

History

1984: Phytogenic feed additive research begins in Austria.
1988: Delacon Biotechnik Ges.m.b.H.  is founded in Steyregg, Austria, by Helmut Dedl. A new category of feed additives - phytogenics - is introduced to the market and the production facility is opened.
2000: Delacon is being certified by ISO 9001 quality management standard and the HACCP (Hazard Analysis of Critical Control Points) concept is implemented.
2001: A patented micro-encapsulation technology is introduced into Delacon products.
2003: Delacon expands globally, Asia Pacific Regional Office is founded. The company receives certifications (QS-partner, GMP-13/QC, EU Regulation 178/2002) and its products are organic farming certified under EU Regulation 2002–91.
2006: First Performing Nature Symposium is organized in Vienna.
2009: The 2nd Performing Nature Symposium is held on the Greek island Crete to celebrate Delacon's 20th anniversary.
2010: Handing-over of daily management to Markus Dedl and founding of Delacon China.
2011: Delacon opens its own Performing Nature Research Center in the Czech Republic.
2012: Fresta® F is approved for use by the EU, and is the world's first phytogenic zootechnical feed additive.
2013: Delacon celebrates its 25th anniversary along with a further enlargement of the production facilities, enabling production capacities to be tripled. 
2014: Delacon hosts its 3rd Performing Nature Symposium, featuring more than 350 guests, including customers, distributors, leading scientists, economists, and industry leaders of the feed sector. Delacon introduces a new corporate design at EuroTier 2014.
2015: Research and Development, Product Management and Innovation teams are united within the division ‘Product & Innovation’.
2016: For the second time, Delacon receives a positive EFSA opinion, this time for the poultry product Biostrong® 510 EC. Delacon enters a strategic partnership with PMI Nutritional Additives, a business unit of Land O ‘Lakes in the USA.
2017: Biostrong® 510 EC is authorized as zootechnical feed additive by the European Commission. Delacon enters a strategic partnership with Cargill, including a minority equity investment.
2022: In June Cargill announced it will acquire the company.

Regulatory affairs
In February 2012, the European Union announced Fresta® F as an approved zootechnical feed additive for weaned piglets. This regulatory category is restricted to products whose performance claims are tested and proven. A thorough evaluation of product safety, quality and efficacy by the European Food Safety Authority, the European Union Reference Laboratory, the EU Commission and 27 EU Member States. This product is the first phytogenic product in the world to meet the standards of proven performance set out by European Union regulators.

In March 2017, Delacon received the zootechnical authorization for a second feed additive: Biostrong® 510 EC for chicken and minor avian species.

Innovation and research
Delacon has introduced a continuous innovation process that aligns the needs from customers, target animals, technology, and production with the long-term strategy for new product development. The focus of research is on animal health, performance, on reducing environmental impact of livestock production such as reduced ammonia and methane; and improving animal welfare.

To ensure that products are developed based on sound scientific knowledge on bio-efficacy and modes of action of phytogenic actives, Delacon invests around ten percent of the annual turnover in the Products and Innovation division. In selection of phytogenic actives, Delacon focuses on natural ingredients to fully use the synergies between actives.

Performing Nature Research Center

To meet a growing internal and external demand for high quality controlled animal studies, Delacon opened its Performing Nature Research Center (PNRC) in 2011. The company-owned facility is used to develop and evaluate new phytogenic substances and formulations with poultry and pigs.

The focus of Delacon's trials is to collect and evaluate data on new phytogenic substances, and product applications. It further investigates effects on nutrient digestibility and utilization, reduction of gaseous emissions, effects of phytogenic feed additives on animal health, all being linked to the animals’ performance. Delacon's PNRC is located in Czech Republic.

References

Further reading
"The Power of Nature: Defining the Scientific Gold Standard", Interview 2017, Delacon

"Phytogenics: overall potential as an alternative to AGPs", Think Grain Think Feed, May 2017, Vol. 3 Issue 7

"Chances for Phytogenic Feed Additives in Antiiotic-free Animal Production", International Animal Health Journal, Volume 4 Issue 1

"Phytogenics - be one step ahead with plant derived feed additives", International Poultry Production, Vol. 24, Number 8

"Phytogenic feed additives: Keeping oxidative stress down with plant extracts", eFeedlink: Technical Forum and Livestock & Feed Business, December 2016

"Phytogenics Improve First-line Defence in Swine and Poultry", International Animal Health Journal, Volume 3 Issue 4

"Using phytogenics to boost gut health in weaned piglets", Gut health - October 2016 (Special Issue of All About Feed)

"Why it makes sense using phytogenic feed additives in grower-finisher pigs", Milling and Grain, May 2017

"On the rise: phytogenics as natural performance enhancers for antibiotic-free feeding programs", Think Grain Think Feed, Vol. 2 Issue 7

"Phytogenics for better gut health in poultry", All About Feed, Vol. 24, Number 5

"Nutritional strategies to support intestinal health in poultry", Milling and Grain, July 2016

"Safe and Effective Phytogenics", International Pig Topics, Volume 27 Number 3

Martin Veit, "Synergistic combination of phytogenic agents for profitable milk production", International Dairy Topics, Volume 8, Number 3

Karola R. Wendler, "Fresta F: The first performance enhancing phytogenic product registered as a zootechnical feed additive", Feed Compounder, April 2012

Karola R. Wendler, B.Z. de Rodas, B. Miller, R. Walker, D. Nelson and J. Marin-Guzman "Effects of the phytogenic feed additive FRESTA® F in nursery pigs", Proc. Soc. Nutr. Physiol. (2006) 15

Elinor McCartney, “The natural empire strikes back”, International Poultry, January 2002

Agriculture companies established in 1988
Manufacturing companies of Austria
Manufacturing companies established in 1988
Austrian companies established in 1988